Boduhuraa as a place name may refer to:
 Boduhuraa (Kaafu Atoll) (Republic of Maldives)
 Boduhuraa (Laamu Atoll) (Republic of Maldives)
 Boduhuraa (Lhaviyani Atoll) (Republic of Maldives)
 Boduhuraa (Noonu Atoll) (Republic of Maldives)
 Boduhuraa (Raa Atoll) (Republic of Maldives)
 Boduhuraa (Faafu Atoll) (Republic of Maldives)